Mariné Russo (born January 9, 1980 in Quilmes) is a retired field hockey player from Argentina who won the bronze medal at the 2004 and 2008 Summer Olympics with the Argentina national team. Mariné also won two World Cups (2002 and 2010), four Champions Trophy, the gold medal at the 2007 Pan American Games and two Pan American Cups. She is affiliated with Quilmes Atletico Club in Buenos Aires.

References 
The Official Website of the Beijing 2008 Olympic Games
 Confederación Argentina de Hockey Official site of the Argentine Hockey Confederation

External links
 

1980 births
Living people
Argentine female field hockey players
Las Leonas players
Olympic field hockey players of Argentina
Field hockey players at the 2004 Summer Olympics
Field hockey players at the 2008 Summer Olympics
Olympic bronze medalists for Argentina
Olympic medalists in field hockey
Argentine people of Italian descent
Medalists at the 2004 Summer Olympics
Medalists at the 2008 Summer Olympics
Pan American Games gold medalists for Argentina
Pan American Games medalists in field hockey
Field hockey players at the 2007 Pan American Games
Medalists at the 2007 Pan American Games
People from Quilmes
Sportspeople from Buenos Aires Province